Evil is a 2003 Swedish drama film which was released to cinemas in Sweden on 26 September 2003, directed by Mikael Håfström, based on Jan Guillou's  semi-autobiographical novel of the same name from 1981, and starring Andreas Wilson, Henrik Lundström and Gustaf Skarsgård. The film is set in a private boarding school in the late-1950s with institutional violence as its theme.

The film was nominated for the Academy Award for Best Foreign Language Film at the 76th Academy Awards. It won three Swedish Guldbagge Awards including Best Film.

Plot
In 1958, Erik Ponti, a 15-year-old boy, lives with his mother and sadistic stepfather in Stockholm. At home, his stepfather beats him every day after dinner. His docile mother ignores her husband's sadistic nature and allows the violence to proceed. At school, Erik is violent and frequently engages in fights, as a result of his violent upbringing. After a particularly vicious fight, Erik is expelled. The headmaster labels him vicious and accuses him of being pure evil. In an attempt to provide her son with a fresh start and last chance to finish school, his mother sells some of her valuable family heirlooms and sends Erik to an affluent boarding school.

Upon arriving in Stjärnsberg, realising the boarding school is his final chance at reaching Sixth Form, Erik attempts to forget his violent tendencies. At the prestigious school twelve members of the Sixth Form form a Student's Council. They exercise a sadistic rule over the school and punish disobeying students physically and psychologically, which is completely ignored by the school staff members who opt to leave the students to their own ways of governing one another's behaviour. When Erik refuses to obey the ludicrous requests of two councilmen, Silverhielm and Dahlén, he becomes the target of relentless bullying. His refusal to demean himself by obeying their humiliating punishments lands him a number of weekend detentions. Erik befriends his intellectual roommate Pierre, who flies below the radar in order to avoid bullying.

Whilst in the school kitchens one weekend, after a particularly grueling day of labour, Erik meets Marja, a pretty cafeteria staff member on a work visa from Finland. The two begin a romantic relationship as Marja admires Erik's resistant and righteous personality. Meanwhile, Erik joins the swimming team. A swimming match approaches and Erik is determined to win, but soon realises that in order to win he must defeat the current school champion and son of the most prominent donor to the school. He knows that winning would make him more of a target than ever, but his fair and dedicated swim coach assures him that it is a matter of honour and he must not lose. Erik wins, breaking a number of school records and humiliating a number of Sixth Formers who sarcastically clap when his accomplishments are vocalised by the swim coach.

For Christmas break Erik goes home. His stepfather beats him mercilessly, whilst his mother plays the piano to disguise the sounds of the cane. When he arrives back at school, the student council begins targeting Erik's intellectual friend Pierre. Pierre does not stand up for himself. Pained to see his friend humiliated Erik leaves the swim team as he believes this will save his friend from the relentless bullying. But that doesn't seem to be enough. A while later, Erik is called up to the council president, Silverhielm's room. There Pierre has been made to strip and Dahlén threatens to put out a cigarette on his chest, but Erik volunteers instead and unflinchingly endures the pain. The next day, Pierre is challenged to fight the councilmen. He gets severely beaten but does not obey their requests.

The following day, Erik is ambushed when walking back from detention. They tie him to the ground and pour boiling water over him followed by cold water and leave him outside to freeze. However, he is rescued by Marja. The two sleep together and Erik returns to his room to find Pierre has left the school. Erik, bitter and fed up, challenges Dahlén and von Schenken to a fight. He quickly defeats both, and then goes in search of Marja, who has left for Finland after being fired for unknown reasons.

The headmaster is given an intercepted love letter by Silverhielm from Marja to Erik, resulting in Erik's expulsion for having sexual relations with a staff member. Erik searches for and finds Silverhielm for revenge in the woods and threatens to kill him. As Silverhielm begs for his life on his knees after being scared into hysteric crying and vomiting, Erik catches himself about to exploit his violent tendencies but stops himself and assures Silverhielm he won't kill him because he is not like him. Erik returns to the school with his mother's family friend, Mr. Ekengren, who is a lawyer. Ekengren confronts the headmaster with the fact the school's interception of Marja's letter constitutes a serious breach of Sweden's secrecy of correspondence laws and threatens to publish the culture of loose law and intentional ignorance of the headmaster and other staff members in the school. Erik is then reinstated, given back the letter from Marja, and is allowed to finish his last semester in relative peace.

The school year ends and Erik returns home to find his mother has been beaten by his stepfather. His stepfather tries to beat him again, but Erik warns him that it is over. He tells his mother, who was in shock, that it is the last time there will be violence in the household and closes the door behind himself as he prepares to get payback for years of violence and beats his stepfather off screen, it is unknown if his stepfather changed or if he left his stepson and wife after Erik beat him. He reconciles with Pierre, who is about to leave for Geneva to continue his education, and sets out to contact Marja and realise his dream of becoming a lawyer.

Cast

Production
Being based on one of the best-selling Swedish books in modern time, there had been discussions about a film adaptions for many years, including several failed attempts, before Mikael Håfström was offered to direct the material. It was originally conceived as a television series, but Håfström felt he was not ready for such an extensive production. Instead he waited a few years and eventually convinced the producers to make it a feature film. Håfström brought in Hans Gunnarsson, with whom he had worked before, as a co-writer, and the writing process as well as the financing went ahead quickly. The budget was 20 million Swedish kronor.

The casting of the supporting actors proceeded without any significant difficulties, but despite auditions for over 120 applicants, a lead actor had still not been found when only two weeks remained before filming was intended to begin. Finally the director recalled Andreas Wilson, a young male model with very limited acting experience whom he had previously met briefly at a birthday party. Håfström contacted people he knew had been at the party to get Wilson's phone number, after which he called him and asked him to come over. Håfström was immediately sure that he had found the right person, and after a few physical tests, Wilson was given the role. Before filming started Wilson had swimming training to learn how to crawl the way swimmers did in the 1950s.

Filming took 30 days to finish, from early October to November 2002. The school Stjärnsberg in the film is based on Solbacka boarding school, a real school attended by the author of the novel. The school was closed in 1973. The original building of Solbacka still exists as a recreation centre for golfers, but had been renovated to such a degree that the director felt it could not be used as a believable filming location. Instead most exterior shots were made around Görvälns slott in Jakobsberg, north of Stockholm. The dining area in the film was built in a studio as a replica of the original school's dining hall, based on photographs from the time. The pool scenes were shot at the school Gubbängsskolan in southern Stockholm.

Songs heard in the film includes "Stupid Cupid" by Neil Sedaka, "The Great Pretender" by The Platters, "Weisser Halunder" by Inger Berggren, and "Peggy Sue" by Buddy Holly & The Crickets.

Release
The film was first shown for potential buyers at the 2003 Cannes Film Festival's Marché du Film. The first public screening was at the Toronto International Film Festival in September the same year. The Swedish premiere followed on 26 September. Evil became a huge commercial success in Sweden with 959,223 admissions in total. On 24 June 2005 it was released in the United Kingdom, and on 10 March 2006 as a limited release in the United States.

Reception

Critical response
Evil has an approval rating of 68% on review aggregator website Rotten Tomatoes, based on 38 reviews, and an average rating of 6.53/10. The website's critical consensus states, "Evil's attempts to unpack the causes and effects of violence aren't always successful, but the well-acted end result still has an unsettling impact. Metacritic assigned the film a weighted average score of 61 out of 100, based on 15 critics, indicating "generally favorable reviews".

Accolades
The film was Sweden's submission for the Academy Award for Best Foreign Language Film at the 76th Academy Awards. On 27 January 2004, it was announced that it had been selected as one of the five nominees. Jan Guillou was unable to attend the Awards, since he did not receive a ticket. At the Swedish Guldbagge Awards it was nominated in seven categories, of which it won three: Best Film, Best Cinematography and Best Production Design. The categories where it did not win were Best Direction, Best Screenplay, Andreas Wilson as Best Actor and Gustaf Skarsgård as Best Supporting Actor.

References

External links

 

2003 films
Films about school violence
Films based on Swedish novels
Films directed by Mikael Håfström
Swedish drama films
2000s Swedish-language films
Best Film Guldbagge Award winners
Films set in boarding schools
2000s teen drama films
2003 drama films
2000s Swedish films